Payangan is a district in Gianyar Regency, Bali, Indonesia. It is near Ubud. 

As of the 2010 census, the area was 75.88 km2 and the population was 41,164; the latest official estimate (as at mid 2019) is 43,190.

References

Districts of Bali
Gianyar Regency
Populated places in Bali